Dalíland is a 2022 American film about the tempestuous marriage of the painter Salvador Dalí and his wife and muse, Gala, in their later years in the 1970s directed by Mary Harron, from a screenplay by John C. Walsh. It stars Ben Kingsley,  Barbara Sukowa, Ezra Miller, Christopher Briney, Alexander Beyer, Avital Lvova, Rupert Graves, Andreja Pejić, Suki Waterhouse, and Mark McKenna.

It had its world premiere at the 2022 Toronto International Film Festival on September 17, 2022. The film received mixed reviews from critics.

Cast
 Ben Kingsley as Salvador Dalí
 Ezra Miller as young Salvador Dalí
 Barbara Sukowa as Gala Dalí
 Avital Lvova as young Gala Dalí
 Christopher Briney as James
 Rupert Graves as Captain Moore
 Alexander Beyer as Christoffe
 Andreja Pejić as Amanda Lear
 Suki Waterhouse as Ginesta
 Mark McKenna as Alice Cooper

Production
In May 2018, Ben Kingsley, Lesley Manville, Tim Roth, Frank Dillane and Ezra Miller joined the cast of the film, with Mary Harron directing from a screenplay by herself and John C. Walsh. Miller was initially cast as James by Harron, but was forced to drop out due to scheduling conflicts with Fantastic Beasts: The Secrets of Dumbledore, leading Harron to cast newcomer Christopher Briney. Miller was instead offered the role of a young Salvador Dalí (who's played by Ben Kingsley for most of the film in his later years), appearing only sparingly in some flashback sequences. In May 2021, Barbara Sukowa, Alexander Beyer, Avital Lvova, Christopher Briney, and Rupert Graves were added, while Andreja Pejić, Suki Waterhouse and Mark McKenna had replaced Manville, Roth and Dillane, and principal photography has been concluded.

The movie was largely filmed in Liverpool which was used to double New York City.

Release
Dalíland had its world premiere at the 2022 Toronto International Film Festival on September 17, 2022. In November 2022, Magnolia Pictures acquired distribution rights to the film.

Reception 
 On Metacritic, the film has a weighted average score of 58 out of 100, based on 7 critics, indicating "mixed or average reviews".

References

External links
 

American drama films
American biographical films
Biographical films about artists
Cultural depictions of Salvador Dalí
Films about marriage
Films directed by Mary Harron
Films set in New York City
Films set in the 1970s
Films shot in Liverpool
2020s American films